A Savannah Haunting is an American supernatural horror film of 2021 directed by William Mark McCullough.

Plot
The family moves to Savannah in the hope of starting life with a clean slate. However, soon terrible things begin to happen in the new house — children see strange marks, Rachel's mother is being chased by a doll resembling her dead daughter, and cracks form in the basement. To save the family, Rachel must solve the terrible mystery of the place where the house was built.

Cast
 Gena Shaw as Rachel Rancourt
 Anna Harriette Pittman as April Rancourt
 Tommi Rose as Lilath
Simbi Khali as Josephine
 William Mark McCullough as William
 Nico Tirozzi as Andrew Rancourt
 Bill Winkler as Dr. Livingston
 Jaelyn Buffkin as Alice
 Dean J. West as Eric Rancourt
 Moses Jones as James
 Brittney Level as Vanessa
 Stephanie Lusk Donahue as EMT

References

External links
 Official website 
 
 One real Savannah haunted house = Two spine-tingling films from Savannah native

American horror films
2021 horror films
2020s English-language films
2020s American films
Lesbian-related films
LGBT-related horror films
American supernatural horror films
Films about imaginary friends
American psychological horror films
Films shot in New Orleans